Douglas Stewart (March 29, 1919 – March 3, 1995) was an American film and television editor with about 16 feature film credits from 1953 – 1983. He won the Academy Award for Best Film Editing for the film, The Right Stuff (1983), along with co-editors Glenn Farr, Lisa Fruchtman, Stephen A. Rotter, and Tom Rolf. The Right Stuff was the fourth film of Stewart's notable collaboration with director Philip Kaufman, which began with The Great Northfield Minnesota Raid (1972). Stewart's extensive television work was honored twice by nominations for Emmy awards.

See also
List of film director and editor collaborations

References

External links

American film editors
Best Film Editing Academy Award winners
American television editors
1919 births
1995 deaths